In mathematics, a Clifford algebra is an algebra generated by a vector space with a quadratic form, and is a unital associative algebra. As -algebras, they generalize the real numbers, complex numbers, quaternions and several other hypercomplex number systems. The theory of Clifford algebras is intimately connected with the theory of quadratic forms and orthogonal transformations. Clifford algebras have important applications in a variety of fields including geometry, theoretical physics and digital image processing. They are named after the English mathematician William Kingdon Clifford (1845 – 1879 ) . 

The most familiar Clifford algebras, the orthogonal Clifford algebras, are also referred to as (pseudo-)Riemannian Clifford algebras, as distinct from symplectic Clifford algebras.

Introduction and basic properties
A Clifford algebra is a unital associative algebra that contains and is generated by a vector space  over a field , where  is equipped with a quadratic form . The Clifford algebra  is the "freest" unital associative algebra generated by  subject to the condition

The idea of being the "freest" or "most general" algebra subject to this identity can be formally expressed through the notion of a universal property, as done below.

This basis may be found by orthogonal diagonalization.

Therefore one obtains a Clifford algebra as the quotient of this tensor algebra by the two-sided ideal generated by elements of the form  for all elements . The product induced by the tensor product in the quotient algebra is written using juxtaposition (e.g. ). Its associativity follows from the associativity of the tensor product.

The Clifford algebra has a distinguished subspace , being the image of the embedding map. Such a subspace cannot in general be uniquely determined given only a -algebra isomorphic to the Clifford algebra.

If the characteristic of the ground field  is not , then one can rewrite the fundamental identity above in the form

where

Quadratic forms and Clifford algebras in characteristic  form an exceptional case. In particular, if  it is not true that a quadratic form uniquely determines a symmetric bilinear form satisfying , nor that every quadratic form admits an orthogonal basis. Many of the statements in this article include the condition that the characteristic is not , and are false if this condition is removed.

As a quantization of the exterior algebra
Clifford algebras are closely related to exterior algebras. Indeed, if  then the Clifford algebra  is just the exterior algebra . That is, they are naturally isomorphic as vector spaces, but with different multiplications (in the case of characteristic two, they are still isomorphic as vector spaces, just not naturally).

The Clifford algebra is a filtered algebra, the associated graded algebra is the exterior algebra.

More precisely, Clifford algebras may be thought of as quantizations (cf. quantum group) of the exterior algebra, in the same way that the Weyl algebra is a quantization of the symmetric algebra.

Weyl algebras and Clifford algebras admit a further structure of a *-algebra, and can be unified as even and odd terms of a superalgebra, as discussed in CCR and CAR algebras.

Universal property and construction
In most cases of interest the field  is either the field of real numbers , or the field of complex numbers , or a finite field.

(where  denotes the multiplicative identity of ), there is a unique algebra homomorphism  such that the following diagram commutes (i.e. such that ):

When the characteristic of the field is not , this may be replaced by what is then an equivalent requirement,

where the bilinear form may additionally be restricted to being symmetric without loss of generality.

A Clifford algebra as described above always exists and can be constructed as follows: start with the most general algebra that contains , namely the tensor algebra , and then enforce the fundamental identity by taking a suitable quotient. In our case we want to take the two-sided ideal  in  generated by all elements of the form
 for all 
and define  as the quotient algebra

The ring product inherited by this quotient is sometimes referred to as the Clifford product to distinguish it from the exterior product and the scalar product.

It is then straightforward to show that  contains  and satisfies the above universal property, so that  is unique up to a unique isomorphism; thus one speaks of "the" Clifford algebra . It also follows from this construction that  is injective.

Namely,  can be considered as a functor from the category of vector spaces with quadratic forms (whose morphisms are linear maps preserving the quadratic form) to the category of associative algebras. The universal property guarantees that linear maps between vector spaces (preserving the quadratic form) extend uniquely to algebra homomorphisms between the associated Clifford algebras.

Basis and dimension

Since  comes equipped with a quadratic form , in characteristic not equal to  there exist bases for  that are orthogonal. An orthogonal basis is one such that for a symmetric bilinear form

The fundamental Clifford identity implies that for an orthogonal basis

This makes manipulation of orthogonal basis vectors quite simple.

The empty product is defined as the multiplicative identity element. For each value of  there are  basis elements, so the total dimension of the Clifford algebra is

Examples: real and complex Clifford algebras
The most important Clifford algebras are those over real and complex vector spaces equipped with nondegenerate quadratic forms.

For a complete classification of these algebras see Classification of Clifford algebras.

Real numbers

Clifford algebras are also sometimes referred to as geometric algebras, most often over the real numbers.

Every nondegenerate quadratic form on a finite-dimensional real vector space is equivalent to the standard diagonal form:

where  is the dimension of the vector space. The pair of integers  is called the signature of the quadratic form.

Of such a basis, the algebra  will therefore have  vectors that square to +1 and  vectors that square to −1.

A few low-dimensional cases are:
 is naturally isomorphic to  since there are no nonzero vectors.
 is a four-dimensional algebra spanned by  The latter three elements all square to −1 and anticommute, and so the algebra is isomorphic to the quaternions 
 is an 8-dimensional algebra isomorphic to the direct sum , the split-biquaternions.

Complex numbers
One can also study Clifford algebras on complex vector spaces. Every nondegenerate quadratic form on a complex vector space of dimension n is equivalent to the standard diagonal form

Thus, for each dimension , up to isomorphism there is only one Clifford algebra of a complex vector space with a nondegenerate quadratic form.

For the first few cases one finds that
, the complex numbers
, the bicomplex numbers
, the biquaternions

Examples: constructing quaternions and dual quaternions

Quaternions
In this section, Hamilton's quaternions are constructed as the even subalgebra of the Clifford algebra 

Let the vector space  be real three-dimensional space  and the quadratic form be the usual quadratic form.

Now introduce the Clifford product of vectors  and  given by

This formulation uses the negative sign so the correspondence with quaternions is easily shown.

and

The general element of the Clifford algebra  is given by

The linear combination of the even degree elements of  defines the even subalgebra  with the general element

The basis elements can be identified with the quaternion basis elements  as

which shows that the even subalgebra  is Hamilton's real quaternion algebra.

To see this, compute

and

Finally,

Dual quaternions
In this section, dual quaternions are constructed as the even Clifford algebra of real four-dimensional space with a degenerate quadratic form.

Let the vector space  be real four-dimensional space  and let the quadratic form  be a degenerate form derived from the Euclidean metric on   For  in  introduce the degenerate bilinear form

This degenerate scalar product projects distance measurements in  onto the  hyperplane.

Note the negative sign is introduced to simplify the correspondence with quaternions.

and

The general element of the Clifford algebra  has 16 components.  The linear combination of the even degree elements defines the even subalgebra  with the general element

The basis elements can be identified with the quaternion basis elements  and the dual unit  as

To see this, compute

and

Examples: in small dimension
Let  be any field of characteristic not .

Dimension 1
For , if  has diagonalization , that is there is a non-zero vector  such that , then  is algebra-isomorphic to a -algebra generated by an element  satisfying , the quadratic algebra .

Dimension 2

Thus  is isomorphic to the (generalized) quaternion algebra . We retrieve Hamilton's quaternions when , since .

Properties

Relation to the exterior algebra
This is an algebra isomorphism if and only if .

The map  is determined by

Note that this only works if the basis  is orthogonal. One can show that this map is independent of the choice of orthogonal basis and so gives a natural isomorphism.

Define functions  by

where the sum is taken over the symmetric group on  elements, . Since  is alternating it induces a unique linear map . This map can be shown to be a linear isomorphism, and it is natural.

Recall that the tensor algebra  has a natural filtration: , where  contains sums of tensors with order . The associated graded algebra

is naturally isomorphic to the exterior algebra .

Grading
In the following, assume that the characteristic is not 2.

Clifford algebras are Z2-graded algebras (also known as superalgebras).

Since  is an involution (i.e. it squares to the identity) one can decompose  into positive and negative eigenspaces of 

where 

Since  is an automorphism it follows that:

where the bracketed superscripts are read modulo 2. This gives  the structure of a Z2-graded algebra. This Z2-grading plays an important role in the analysis and application of Clifford algebras. The automorphism  is called the main involution or grade involution. Elements that are pure in this Z2-grading are simply said to be even or odd.

Remark. In characteristic not 2 the underlying vector space of  inherits an N-grading and a Z-grading from the canonical isomorphism with the underlying vector space of the exterior algebra . It is important to note, however, that this is a vector space grading only. Happily, the gradings are related in the natural way: . Further, the Clifford algebra is Z-filtered: 

The degree of a Clifford number usually refers to the degree in the N-grading.

The even subalgebra  of a Clifford algebra is itself isomorphic to a Clifford algebra. In particular over the reals this implies that:

In the negative-definite case this gives an inclusion , which extends the sequence

Antiautomorphisms
In addition to the automorphism , there are two antiautomorphisms that play an important role in the analysis of Clifford algebras. Recall that the tensor algebra  comes with an antiautomorphism that reverses the order in all products of vectors:

The transpose is an antiautomorphism: . The transpose operation makes no use of the Z2-grading so we define a second antiautomorphism by composing  and the transpose. We call this operation Clifford conjugation denoted 

Of the two antiautomorphisms, the transpose is the more fundamental.

Note that all of these operations are involutions. One can show that they act as ±1 on elements which are pure in the Z-grading. In fact, all three operations depend only on the degree modulo 4. That is, if x is pure with degree k then

where the signs are given by the following table:

Clifford scalar product
A basis-independent definition of one such extension is

where ⟨a⟩ denotes the scalar part of a (the degree-0 part in the Z-grading). One can show that

The operator of left (respectively right) Clifford multiplication by the transpose a of an element a is the adjoint of left (respectively right) Clifford multiplication by a with respect to this inner product. That is,

and

Structure of Clifford algebras
In this section we assume that characteristic is not 2, the vector space V is finite-dimensional and that the associated symmetric bilinear form of Q is nondegenerate. 

For example, the central simple algebras over the reals are matrix algebras over either the reals or the quaternions.

If V has even dimension then  is a central simple algebra over K.
If V has even dimension then the even subalgebra  is a central simple algebra over a quadratic extension of K or a sum of two isomorphic central simple algebras over K.
If V has odd dimension then  is a central simple algebra over a quadratic extension of K or a sum of two isomorphic central simple algebras over K.
If V has odd dimension then the even subalgebra  is a central simple algebra over K.

The structure of Clifford algebras can be worked out explicitly using the following result. Suppose that  has even dimension and a non-singular bilinear form with discriminant , and suppose that  is another vector space with a quadratic form. Over the reals, this implies in particular that

These formulas can be used to find the structure of all real Clifford algebras and all complex Clifford algebras;  see the classification of Clifford algebras.

Notably, the Morita equivalence class of a Clifford algebra (its representation theory: the equivalence class of the category of modules over it) depends only on the signature . This is an algebraic form of Bott periodicity.

Lipschitz group
The class of Lipschitz groups ( Clifford groups or Clifford–Lipschitz groups) was discovered by Rudolf Lipschitz.

In this section we assume that  is finite-dimensional and the quadratic form  is nondegenerate.

An action on the elements of a Clifford algebra by its group of units may be defined in terms of a twisted conjugation: twisted conjugation by  maps , where  is the main involution defined above.

The Lipschitz group  is defined to be the set of invertible elements  that stabilize the set of vectors under this action, meaning that for all   in  we have:

This formula also defines an action of the Lipschitz group on the vector space V that preserves the quadratic form Q, and so gives a homomorphism from the Lipschitz group to the orthogonal group. (In characteristic  these are called orthogonal transvections rather than reflections.)

If V is a finite-dimensional real vector space with a non-degenerate quadratic form then the Lipschitz group maps onto the orthogonal group of V with respect to the form (by the Cartan–Dieudonné theorem) and the kernel consists of the nonzero elements of the field K. This leads to exact sequences

Over other fields or with indefinite forms, the map is not in general onto, and the failure is captured by the spinor norm.

Spinor norm

In arbitrary characteristic, the spinor norm Q is defined on the Lipschitz group by

It is a homomorphism from the Lipschitz group to the group K× of non-zero elements of K. It coincides with the quadratic form Q of V when V is identified with a subspace of the Clifford algebra. Several authors define the spinor norm slightly differently, so that it differs from the one here by a factor of −1, 2, or −2 on Γ1. The difference is not very important in characteristic other than 2.

The nonzero elements of K have spinor norm in the group (K×)2 of squares of nonzero elements of the field K. So when V is finite-dimensional and non-singular we get an induced map from the orthogonal group of V to the group K×/(K×)2, also called the spinor norm. The spinor norm of the reflection about r⊥, for any vector r, has image Q(r) in K×/(K×)2, and this property uniquely defines it on the orthogonal group. This gives exact sequences:

Note that in characteristic 2 the group {±1} has just one element.

From the point of view of Galois cohomology of algebraic groups, the spinor norm is a connecting homomorphism on cohomology. Writing μ2 for the algebraic group of square roots of 1 (over a field of characteristic not 2 it is roughly the same as a two-element group with trivial Galois action), the short exact sequence

yields a long exact sequence on cohomology, which begins

where the spinor norm is the connecting homomorphism .

Spin and Pin groups

In this section we assume that  is finite-dimensional and its bilinear form is non-singular.

When the characteristic is not , these are the elements of determinant . The spin group usually has index  in the pin group.

Recall from the previous section that there is a homomorphism from the Lipschitz group onto the orthogonal group. If  does not have characteristic  this is just the group of elements of the orthogonal group of determinant . If  does have characteristic , then all elements of the orthogonal group have determinant , and the special orthogonal group is the set of elements of Dickson invariant .

There is a homomorphism from the pin group to the orthogonal group. The image consists of the elements of spinor norm .

In the common case when  is a positive or negative definite space over the reals, the spin group maps onto the special orthogonal group, and is simply connected when  has dimension at least . In this case the algebraic group  is simply connected as an algebraic group, even though its group of real valued points  is not simply connected. This is a rather subtle point, which completely confused the authors of at least one standard book about spin groups.

Spinors

Clifford algebras , with  even, are matrix algebras which have a complex representation of dimension . By restricting to the group  we get a complex representation of the Pin group of the same dimension, called the spin representation. If we restrict this to the spin group  then it splits as the sum of two half spin representations (or Weyl representations) of dimension .

If  is odd then the Clifford algebra  is a sum of two matrix algebras, each of which has a representation of dimension , and these are also both representations of the Pin group . On restriction to the spin group  these become isomorphic, so the spin group has a complex spinor representation of dimension .

More generally, spinor groups and pin groups over any field have similar representations whose exact structure depends on the structure of the corresponding Clifford algebras: whenever a Clifford algebra has a factor that is a matrix algebra over some division algebra, we get a corresponding representation of the pin and spin groups over that division algebra.
For examples over the reals see the article on spinors.

Real spinors

To describe the real spin representations, one must know how the spin group sits inside its Clifford algebra. The pin group,  is the set of invertible elements in  that can be written as a product of unit vectors:

Comparing with the above concrete realizations of the Clifford algebras, the pin group corresponds to the products of arbitrarily many reflections: it is a cover of the full orthogonal group .  The spin group consists of those elements of  that are products of an even number of unit vectors.  Thus by the Cartan–Dieudonné theorem Spin is a cover of the group of proper rotations .

Let  be the automorphism which is given by the mapping  acting on pure vectors. Let

Then the spin group lies within .

The irreducible representations of  restrict to give representations of the pin group. Conversely, since the pin group is generated by unit vectors, all of its irreducible representation are induced in this manner. Thus the two representations coincide.

To classify the pin representations, one need only appeal to the classification of Clifford algebras.  To find the spin representations (which are representations of the even subalgebra), one can first make use of either of the isomorphisms (see above)

Applications

Differential geometry
One of the principal applications of the exterior algebra is in differential geometry where it is used to define the bundle of differential forms on a smooth manifold. In the case of a (pseudo-)Riemannian manifold, the tangent spaces come equipped with a natural quadratic form induced by the metric. Thus, one can define a Clifford bundle in analogy with the exterior bundle. This has a number of important applications in Riemannian geometry. Perhaps more important is the link to a spin manifold, its associated spinor bundle and  manifolds.

Physics
Clifford algebras have numerous important applications in physics. Physicists usually consider a Clifford algebra to be an algebra with a basis generated by the matrices  called Dirac matrices which have the property that

where  is the matrix of a quadratic form of signature  (or  corresponding to the two equivalent choices of metric signature). However, it is best to retain the notation , since any transformation that takes the bilinear form to the canonical form is not a Lorentz transformation of the underlying spacetime.

It has in addition a set of preferred transformations – Lorentz transformations. Whether complexification is necessary to begin with depends in part on conventions used and in part on how much one wants to incorporate straightforwardly, but complexification is most often necessary in quantum mechanics where the spin representation of the Lie algebra  sitting inside the Clifford algebra conventionally requires a complex Clifford algebra. For reference, the spin Lie algebra is given by

The Dirac matrices were first written down by Paul Dirac when he was trying to write a relativistic first-order wave equation for the electron, and give an explicit isomorphism from the Clifford algebra to the algebra of complex matrices. The result was used to define the Dirac equation and introduce the Dirac operator. The entire Clifford algebra shows up in quantum field theory in the form of Dirac field bilinears.

The use of Clifford algebras to describe quantum theory has been advanced among others by Mario Schönberg, by David Hestenes in terms of geometric calculus, by David Bohm and Basil Hiley and co-workers in form of a hierarchy of Clifford algebras, and by Elio Conte et al.

Computer vision
Clifford algebras have been applied in the problem of action recognition and classification in computer vision. Rodriguez et al. propose a Clifford embedding to generalize traditional MACH filters to video (3D spatiotemporal volume), and vector-valued data such as optical flow. Vector-valued data is analyzed using the Clifford Fourier Transform. Based on these vectors action filters are synthesized in the Clifford Fourier domain and recognition of actions is performed using Clifford correlation. The authors demonstrate the effectiveness of the Clifford embedding by recognizing actions typically performed in classic feature films and sports broadcast television.

Generalizations
 While this article focuses on a Clifford algebra of a vector space over a field, the definition extends without change to a module over any unital, associative, commutative ring.
 Clifford algebras may be generalized to a form of degree higher than quadratic over a vector space.

See also

Algebra of physical space, APS
Cayley–Dickson construction
Classification of Clifford algebras
Clifford analysis
Clifford module
Complex spin structure
Dirac operator
Exterior algebra
Fierz identity
Gamma matrices
Generalized Clifford algebra
Geometric algebra
Higher-dimensional gamma matrices
Hypercomplex number
Octonion
Paravector
Quaternion
Spin group
Spin structure
Spinor
Spinor bundle

Notes

References

Sources
 , section IX.9.
 Carnahan, S. Borcherds Seminar Notes, Uncut. Week 5, "Spinors and Clifford Algebras".
 
 
 
 . An advanced textbook on Clifford algebras and their applications to differential geometry.
 
 
 ; ibid II (1883) 46; ibid III (1884) 7–9. Summarized in The Collected Mathematics Papers of James Joseph Sylvester (Cambridge University Press, 1909) v III. online and further.

Further reading

External links

Planetmath entry on Clifford algebras
A history of Clifford algebras (unverified)
John Baez on Clifford algebras
Clifford Algebra: A Visual Introduction

 
Ring theory
Quadratic forms